Thomas Edward Humphrey (born November 19, 1945) is an American lawyer and jurist. He served as an associate justice on the Maine Supreme Judicial Court from 2015 to 2022. Hs is a former chief justice of the Maine Superior Court.

Early life and education
Humphrey graduated from Rocky Hill High School in 1963.  Humphrey graduated cum laude from Boston College in 1969. He earned his Juris Doctor from Boston College Law School in 1972.

Career
Humphrey was a member of Boston College Law Review from 1970 to 1972, serving as an editor from 1971 to 1972. From 1976 to 1993 he was in private practice and was a prosecutor for the York County District Attorney's Office. 

From 1993 to 1998 he served as a judge on the Maine District Court. From 1998 to 2015 he served as a justice and later chief justice of the Maine Superior Court.

In 2015 he was nominated by Governor Paul LePage and confirmed by the Maine Senate, to the Maine Supreme Judicial Court.

References

External links
Directory of Maine Superior Court Justices

1945 births
Living people
People from Hartford, Connecticut
Boston College alumni
Boston College Law School alumni
Maine state court judges
Justices of the Maine Supreme Judicial Court
20th-century American lawyers
20th-century American judges
21st-century American judges